Long Live Nut is the debut EP by American rapper YFN Lucci. It was released on April 4, 2017, by Think It's A Game Records and Empire Distribution. It features guest appearances from Rick Ross, Boosie Badazz, Lil Durk, PnB Rock, Dreezy, and YFN Trae Pound.

Commercial performance
The EP debuted at number 27 on the US Billboard 200.

Track listing
Credits were adapted from Tidal.

Notes
  signifies an additional producer
  signifies an uncredited co-producer
 "Heartless" features additional vocals from Nut

Personnel
Credits were adapted from the album's liner notes.

Performers
 YFN Lucci – primary artist
 Rick Ross – featured artist 
 YFN Trae Pound – featured artist 
 Dreezy – featured artist 
 PnB Rock – featured artist 
 Lil Durk – featured artist 
 Boosie Badazz – featured artist 

Technical
 Keith Dawson – mixing engineer , recording engineer 
 John Horesco – mastering engineer 

Production
 June James – producer 
 Ramy on the Beat – producer 
 Will-A-Fool – producer 
 Metro Boomin – producer 
 OG Parker – producer 
 Edimah – additional producer 
 Tino Burna – producer 
 Donis Beats – producer 
 Fatman – uncredited co-producer 

Additional personnel
 YFN Lucci – executive producer
 Girvan "Fly" Henry – executive producer
 Osose "Sose" Ebadan – A&R direction
 Daeshawn "Dae-Day" Shelton – A&R direction, art design and direction
 Kim Dockery – A&R administration
 Jhadrick Ferell – manager
 Cam Kirk – photography
 Brandon Leach – art design and direction

Charts

Weekly charts

Year-end charts

References

2017 debut EPs
Hip hop EPs
Empire Distribution EPs
Albums produced by Metro Boomin
Albums produced by OG Parker